The rivalry between South China and TSW Pegasus is the football local derby in Hong Kong between South China and TSW Pegasus (known from 2008 to 2012 as TSW Pegasus, from 2012 to 2015 as Sun Pegasus, and from 2015 to 2020 as Hong Kong Pegasus).

Background
TSW Pegasus FC was founded as TSW Pegasus FC by various people from the Yuen Long District Council in 2008, with the help of South China chairman Steven Lo and his entertainment company bma, as well as his spouse Canny Leung, who was one of the members of the board. Moreover, players including Cheng Siu Wai and Deng Jinghuang joined TSW Pegasus from South China soon after the club was founded. As a result, matches between them are widely known as rivalry between South China and South China B team.

History
Despite TSW Pegasus suffering a 0–3 defeat to South China in the first match between the clubs, they went on to win three times over South China in the Senior Shield, the League Cup and the Hong Kong FA Cup in the same season. However, between that season and 20 November 2011, TSW Pegasus never defeated South China. The drought was broken when they won the November match 2–1.

TSW Pegasus was renamed as Sun Pegasus for the 2012–13 season. They nearly won the away league match at Hong Kong Stadium, but Dhiego Martins' controversial goal brought South China a point.

Sun Pegasus was then renamed as Hong Kong Pegasus for the 2015–16 season.

In 2020, the club's name reverted to TSW Pegasus.

Results

First Division

Other results

Honours
These are the major football honours of South China and TSW Pegasus.

References 

South China AA
TSW Pegasus FC
Hong Kong football derbies
Association football rivalries
2008 establishments in Hong Kong